Josip Tomašević (born 26 September 1993) is a Croatian footballer who plays for BSK Bijelo Brdo as a defender.

References

External links
 

1993 births
Living people
People from Virovitica
Association football defenders
Croatian footballers
Croatia youth international footballers
NK Osijek players
NK Novigrad players
HNK Cibalia players
NK Rudar Velenje players
NK Istra 1961 players
NK BSK Bijelo Brdo players
Croatian Football League players
First Football League (Croatia) players
Slovenian PrvaLiga players
Croatian expatriate footballers
Expatriate footballers in Slovenia
Croatian expatriate sportspeople in Slovenia